Three Little Sisters is a 1944 American comedy directed by Joseph Santley, written by Olive Cooper, and starring Mary Lee, Ruth Terry, Cheryl Walker, William Terry, Jackie Moran and Charles Arnt. It was released on July 31, 1944, by Republic Pictures.

Plot
Two sisters cover for a third whose misled GI pen pal has come to visit from Arizona.

Cast  
Mary Lee as Sue Scott
Ruth Terry as Hallie Scott
Cheryl Walker as Lily Scott
William Terry as Pvt. Robert Mason
Jackie Moran as Chad Jones
Charles Arnt as Ezra Larkin
Frank Jenks as Pvt. 'Rosy' Rowman
Bill Shirley as Pvt. Ferguson
Tom Fadden as Ambrose Pepperdine
Tom London as Twitchell
Milton Kibbee as Tom Scott
Addison Richards as Col. Flemming
Lillian Randolph as Mabel
Sam McDaniel as Benjy 
Forrest Taylor as Mayor Thatcher

References

External links 
 

1944 films
1940s English-language films
American comedy films
1944 comedy films
Republic Pictures films
Films directed by Joseph Santley
American black-and-white films
1940s American films